Levoton Tuhkimo (Restless Cinderella) is a popular song released in 1984 by the Finnish rock band Dingo. It is part of the album Nimeni on Dingo (My name is Dingo) produced by Pave Maijanen under the Fazer Finnlevy music label.
This popular song has been remixed twice, in 1992 and in 1993, and has been reinterpreted by the Scandinavian Music Group in 2008 in their tributary album Melkein vieraissa - Nimemme on Dingo. Estonian artist Mari-Leen Kaselaan's song "Rahutu tuhkatriinu" is also based on Levoton Tuhkimo. The song lasts about 4:12.

Composition of the band 
Its original version is played by:
Pertti Neumann (Vocals)
Jonttu Virta   (Guitar)
Jarkko Eve     (Bass/ Vocals)
Pete Nuotio    (Synthesiser)
Juha Seittonen (Drums)

Finnish songs